Velliyazhcha is a 1969 Indian Malayalam film, Vellikizhamai (Friday) story written in Tamil by Swathi and translated in Malayalam by S. L. Puram Sadandan, directed by M. M. Nesan and Swathi Ranga Chary and produced by Solar Pictures owned by Swathi family. The film stars Sathyan, Madhu, Sharada and Muthukulam Raghavan Pillai in the lead roles. The film had musical score and songs composed by M. S. Baburaj. It marked the debut of Malayalam cinema's  music director Raveendran as a singer.

Cast

Sathyan
Madhu
Sharada
Muthukulam Raghavan Pillai
Sankaradi
T. R. Omana
Paul Vengola
Ambika
Bahadoor
Khadeeja
Kumari Padmini
Meena
Paravoor Bharathan
Puthuval
Vallathol Unnikrishnan

Soundtrack
The music was composed by M. S. Baburaj and the lyrics were written by P. Bhaskaran.

References

External links
 

1969 films
1960s Malayalam-language films